Statistics of Chinese Jia-A League for the 1988 season.

Overview
It was contested by 21 teams, and Liaoning F.C. won the championship.

First round

Second round

Places 1–12

Group A

Group B

Final ranking

Places 13–21

References
China - List of final tables (RSSSF)

Chinese Jia-A League seasons
1
China
China
1988 establishments in China